The Thomas M. and Bridget Blackstock House is located in Sheboygan, Wisconsin, United States. It was added to the National Register of Historic Places in 1995. The Blackstock House is a two-story, balloon frame, clapboard home designed by architect Arvin Luce Weeks in the Italianate style.

The house was originally built for Thomas M. Blackstock, and Irish immigrant who made his fortune from the Phoenix Chair Company and the Sheboygan Mutual Loan, Saving, and Building Association, and his wife, Bridget Blackstock (née Denn). Thomas Blackstock served as a city councilman for three terms, as Mayor of Sheboygan for four, and as a representative to the Michigan House of Representatives.

References

Buildings and structures in Sheboygan, Wisconsin
Houses in Sheboygan County, Wisconsin
Houses on the National Register of Historic Places in Wisconsin
Italianate architecture in Wisconsin
National Register of Historic Places in Sheboygan County, Wisconsin
Houses completed in 1882